The Cuban pine toad (Peltophryne cataulaciceps), or Schwartz's Caribbean toad, is a species of toad in the family Bufonidae. Its natural habitats are savannas with pinewood, palms, and sandy soils. Breeding takes place in temporary pools, flooded pastures, and other shallow bodies of standing water; it can be abundant at breeding aggregations, but is otherwise hard to see. It is threatened by habitat loss caused by agriculture and sand extraction. Its habitat is also threatened by the invasive tree, Dichrostachys cinerea.

References

cataulaciceps
Amphibians of Cuba
Endemic fauna of Cuba
Taxonomy articles created by Polbot
Amphibians described in 1959